Tushia (lit. Wisdom, Being Resourceful) is a religious community settlement in southern Israel. Located around five kilometres from Netivot and east of Kfar Maimon, it falls under the jurisdiction of Sdot Negev Regional Council.

History
The village was established in 1958 and was initially named Shuva Heh, before adopting its current name, taken from the Book of Proverbs 2:7;
He layeth up sound wisdom for the upright, He is a shield to them that walk in integrity;

References

Community settlements
Religious Israeli communities
Populated places established in 1958
Gaza envelope
Populated places in Southern District (Israel)
1958 establishments in Israel